Farthinghoe is a village and civil parish in West Northamptonshire, England.

The origin of the village's name is uncertain. Possibly, 'hill-spur of the dwellers among the ferns' or perhaps, 'ferny-place hill spur'.

At the time of the 2001 census, the parish's population was 418 people,  reducing slightly to 413 at the 2011 census.

Buildings
The parish church is dedicated to St Michael and of 13th-century origin. There are monuments to Henrietta and Catherine Rush (d.1801) and George Rush (d.1806). This is by the celebrated London sculptor, Charles Regnart.

Other buildings of note are Abbey Lodge west of the church, believed to be 1581 and Farthinghoe Lodge about 1 mile south west.

Most of the village is a conservation area.

Farthinghoe railway station closed completely in 1963.

Facilities
The village primary school is Farthinghoe County Primary School.

There is a pub The Fox in Baker Street.

Transport

The road through the village (the A422) has two sharp, narrow bends. It was resurfaced in 2015 after being damaged by traffic.

See also

Parish Council

References

Villages in Northamptonshire
Civil parishes in Northamptonshire